Janq'uquta or Janq'u Quta (Aymara janq'u white, quta lake, "white lake", hispanicized spellings Janccoccota, Janjojota, Janjoqota) is a lake in Peru located in the Puno Region, Melgar Province, Orurillo District. Janq'uquta lies between the La Raya mountain range in the north-west and Lake Titicaca in the south-east at the mountain Janq'u Q'awa.

See also
List of lakes in Peru

References

Lakes of Peru
Lakes of Puno Region